Abbasabad (also Romanized as ‘Abbāsābād; also known as Mobārakābād) is a village in Emamzadeh Aqaali Abbas Rural District, Emamzadeh District, Natanz County, Isfahan Province, Iran. At the 2006 census, its population was 206, in 58 families.

References 

Populated places in Natanz County